Hasan Rasa may refer to:
 Hasan Raza (cricketer, born 1982), Pakistani international cricketer
 Hasan Raza (cricketer, born 1995), Pakistani first-class cricketer
 Hasan Raza Pasha, Pakistani lawyer
 Raza Hasan, Pakistani international cricketer
 Hasan Rıza, Ottoman soldier
 Hasan Rıza Pasha, Ottoman general
 Hassan Raza Ghadeeri, Pakistani Ayatollah
 Hasan Reza Rural District